This is a list of members of the Australian Senate from 1938 to 1941. Half of its members were elected at the 15 September 1934 election and had terms starting on 1 July 1935 and finishing on 30 June 1941; the other half were elected at the 23 October 1937 election and had terms starting on 1 July 1938 and finishing on 30 June 1944. The process for filling casual vacancies was complex. While senators were elected for a six-year term, people appointed to a casual vacancy only held office until the earlier of the next election for the House of Representatives or the Senate.

Notes

References

Members of Australian parliaments by term
20th-century Australian politicians
Australian Senate lists